The 2009 Louisiana–Lafayette Ragin' Cajuns football team represented the University of Louisiana at Lafayette in the 2009 NCAA Division I FBS football season. The Ragin' Cajuns were led by eighth year head coach Rickey Bustle and played their home games at Cajun Field. The Ragin' Cajuns finished the season with a record of 6–6 overall and 4–4 in Sun Belt Conference play.

The 41,357 attendance at the Hebert Heymann Football Classic against Southern still holds the record for most attendance at Cajun Field

Preseason

Award Watchlist

Sun Belt Media Day

Preseason Standings

Roster

Schedule

Game summaries

Southern

Kansas State

@ LSU

@ Nebraska

North Texas

@ Western Kentucky

Florida Atlantic

@ Florida International

@ Arkansas State

@ Middle Tennessee

Louisiana-Monroe

Troy

References

Louisiana-Lafayette
Louisiana Ragin' Cajuns football seasons
Louisiana-Lafayette Ragin' Cajuns football